The 2023 Southeastern Conference women's basketball tournament was a postseason women's basketball tournament for the Southeastern Conference was held at the Bon Secours Wellness Arena in Greenville, South Carolina, from March1 through 5, 2023. South Carolina earns an automatic bid to the 2023 NCAA Division I women's basketball tournament.

Seeds

Schedule

Bracket

References

2022–23 Southeastern Conference women's basketball season
SEC women's basketball tournament
Basketball competitions in Greenville, South Carolina
SEC Women's Basketball
Women's sports in South Carolina
College basketball tournaments in South Carolina
SEC women's basketball